The Airline Tariff Publishing Company (commonly known as ATPCO) is a privately held corporation that engages in the collection and distribution of fare and fare-related data for the airline and travel industry. ATPCO currently works with more than 400 airlines worldwide, and it supplies more than 99% of the industry’s intermediated fare data to all the major airfare pricing engines, storing over 306 million active fares in its database and managing an average of 14.5 million fare changes each day.

The users of ATPCO’s data are Global Distribution Systems (GDS), such as Sabre, Amadeus, Travelport, and their associated travel agents; the Central Reservation Systems (CRS) of airlines; online travel agencies (OTA) such as Expedia, Orbitz, and Travelocity; and other service providers in the travel industry.

In January 2020, Alex Zoghlin took over as the new President and CEO.

Locations 
Based at Washington Dulles International Airport, ATPCO also has offices in Miami, New York, London, Bulgaria, and Singapore.

Owners 
The following airlines are owners of ATPCO:
 Air Canada
 Air France
 All Nippon Airways
 American Airlines
 British Airways
 Delta Air Lines
 Hawaiian Airlines
 KLM Royal Dutch Airlines
 LATAM Airlines
 Lufthansa German Airlines
 United Airlines

History
The Air Traffic Conference of America, a body within the Air Transport Association of America (ATA), was founded in 1945 to publish passenger tariffs (fares). In 1958 it assumed publication of freight tariffs, formerly produced by Air Cargo, Inc., and in 1965 the group divested from ATA as an independent company, Airline Tariff Publishers, Inc. It was reorganized and took its current name in 1975.

In the 1980s and 1990s, ATPCO digitized the information filed on paper tariffs, automating manual processes and enabling electronic connectivity for airfares in the industry. In later decades, ATPCO has continued to automate more types of pricing and related data, such as baggage allowance and charges.

In February 2018, ATPCO acquired Routehappy. The acquisition increases ATPCO’s merchandising capabilities combining its flagship pricing data with Routehappy rich content.

A few months later, ATPCO was awarded a patent for its cacheless airline ticket pricing technology, which allows the calculation of all possible airline ticket prices, regardless of availability.

In 2022, ATPCO donated its collection of historical fares, rules, and routes to the Library of Congress, where they are now accessible to the public.

References

Companies based in Dulles, Virginia
Business services companies established in 1965
1965 establishments in Virginia